Gamma Eta Gamma is a professional law fraternity and was a member of the Professional Fraternity Association.

Chapters are limited to law schools on the approved list of the American Bar Association.

History

Gamma Eta Gamma was founded on February 25, 1901 at the University of Maine School of Law. By 1976 it had 33 charters and over 7,000 initiates.

From the beginning the Fraternity exhorted its members to a high degree of personal and professional conduct. At its founding, the three men who established the Fraternity wrote in their own handwriting into the preamble of its constitution:
"We the undersigned students of the Law School of the University of Maine, with a view of establishing on this and other schools of law, as well as in the general practice of the profession, an elevated standard of personal deportment, a high code of professional ethics and a broad and catholic development of mental culture and moral character, do associate ourselves in the lasting bonds of a fraternal union under the name of Gamma Eta Gamma." 
The pledge manual included chapters on how to study law effectively, a chapter on etiquette, and general fraternity information.

Founders
The founders were: 
Charles Vey Holman
Charles Hickson Reid, Jr.
Harold Dudley Greeley.

Conventions and governance
The convention, called a "Witan", was at first held annually beginning in 1901. Later this shifted to a biennial basis, with province conferences held in off years.

While the Fraternity had multiple chapters, in the interim between conventions, management responsibilities were held by a council of twelve members called the "Curia," consisting of four elective executive officers and officials from the eight provinces of the fraternity. Eight of these twelve leaders were required to be alumni.

By 2017, there was one remaining active chapter, the University of Minnesota Law School in Minneapolis.

Governance is now held by this successor chapter, managed as an informal, local fraternity with cooperative housing, in Minneapolis.

Traditions and Insignia
Founders' Day is generally held on the anniversary of founding, February 25. However some chapters celebrated the Prandium Cancellari on June 7, which was the date of the fraternity's first banquet in 1901.

The badge is a shield with a lamp, a star and a Roman fasces or bundle, above the motto. The official badge contains 20 pearls surrounding the shield. The outgoing president, or High Chancellor is awarded a badge with a diamond border.

The pledge pin is a circular button, with the letters    appearing in a circle on a red field, imposed on a triangle, with the rest of the button in black.

There is a fasces key, in gold, for alumni graduated with a degree in law, with the letters of the Fraternity name on the face of the key.

The colors of the Fraternity are red and black.

Chapter list
Chapter information from Baird's Manual. Inactive groups indicated by italics, the active chapter in bold.  Where known, dates of inactivity are noted.  The only active chapter is Chi chapter at Minnesota, which maintains active membership for law students.
1901 - Alpha, University of Maine School of Law
1902 - Beta, Boston University School of Law
1904 - Gamma, Albany Law School
1908 - Delta, Syracuse University College of Law (1932)
1909 - Epsilon, Cornell Law School (1918)
1911 - Zeta, University of Michigan Law School (1929)
1911 - Eta, Indiana University Maurer School of Law
1912 - Theta, Creighton University School of Law
1914 - Iota, Georgetown University Law Center
1915 - Kappa. University of Oregon School of Law (1917) 
1919 - Lambda, Northwestern University Pritzker School of Law
1919 - Mu, University of Detroit Mercy School of Law
1920 - Nu, University of Chicago Law School
1920 - Xi, Fordham University School of Law
1920 - Omicron, University of Maryland, Law
1921 - Pi, University of Illinois College of Law (1931)
1922 - Rho, Ohio State University Moritz College of Law
1922 - Sigma, USC Gould School of Law
1922 - Tau, Vanderbilt University (1928)
1923 - Upsilon, University of Wisconsin–Madison
1923 - Phi, University of Iowa
1924 - Chi, Current Alpha University of Minnesota Law School
1925 - Omega, Washington University in St. Louis (MO) (1929)
1927 - Beta Gamma, Wake Forest University
1929 - Beta Delta, Duke University
1930 - Beta Epsilon, LSU
1930 - Beta Zeta, Case Western Reserve University
1931 - Beta Eta, George Washington University
1931 - Beta Kappa Catholic University
1931 - Beta Theta Santa Clara University School of Law
1934 - Beta Mu, DePaul University
1950 - Beta Nu, University of Virginia

See also 
 Order of the Coif (honor society, law)
 The Order of Barristers (honor society, law; litigation)
 Phi Delta Phi (honor society, law; was a professional fraternity)
 Alpha Phi Sigma (honor society, criminal justice)
 Lambda Epsilon Chi (honor society, paralegal)

 Professional fraternities and sororities

References

Student organizations established in 1901
Professional legal fraternities and sororities in the United States
Former members of Professional Fraternity Association
1901 establishments in Maine